Denis Dallan (born 4 March 1978) is an Italian rugby union footballer. His usual position is on the wing. He plays for the Italian club Amatori Milan. Dallan has been capped for the national team and was a part of its squad at the 2003 Rugby World Cup in Australia.

Playing career
Dallan was born in Asolo, province of Treviso. He played for Benetton Treviso in Italy and for Stade Français Paris, a top club in the elite level of domestic French rugby, the Top 14. He then played for Venezia Mestre, before moving to Amatori Milan in October 2009.

He made his first appearance for Italy in 1999 and since then has earned 40 caps for the national team. He made his Test debut against Scotland on 6 March, although earlier that year he played for Italy against a non-cap French XV, and in 1997 he represented Italy 'A' against Denmark. He became a regular in the Italian Test side, and in 2003 was included in its World Cup squad for Australia. He played in three matches at the World Cup, against Tonga, Canada and Wales.

Miscellaneous
Dallan is an accomplished singer and led the singing of the Italian national anthem for the international against the All Blacks held at the San Siro Stadium in November 2009.

References

External links
 RBS 6 Nations profile
 Denis Dallan on ercrugby.com
 Denis Dallan on rwc2003.irb.com

1978 births
Living people
People from Asolo
Italian rugby union players
Rugby union wings
Stade Français players
Italy international rugby union players
Sportspeople from the Province of Treviso